The Seidelmann 299 is an American sailboat that was designed by Bob Seidelmann as a performance cruiser and first built in 1979.

Production
The design was built by Seidelmann Yachts in the United States, between 1979 and 1981, but it is now out of production.

Design
The Seidelmann 299 is a recreational keelboat, built predominantly of fiberglass, with wood trim. It has a masthead sloop rig, a raked stem, a reverse transom, an internally mounted spade-type rudder controlled by a tiller and a fixed fin keel or optional shoal draft keel. The fin keel version displaces  and carries  of ballast, while the shoal draft version displaces  and carries  of ballast.

The boat is fitted with a Japanese Yanmar diesel engine for docking and maneuvering.

The design has sleeping accommodation for five people, with a double "V"-berth in the bow cabin, two straight settee berths in the main cabin and an aft cabin with a quarter berth on the port side. The galley is located on the starboard side just forward of the companionway ladder. The galley is "L"-shaped and is equipped with a stove, icebox and a sink. The head is located just aft of the bow cabin on the port side.

See also
List of sailing boat types

References

Sailing yachts
Keelboats
1970s sailboat type designs
Sailboat type designs by Bob Seidelmann
Sailboat types built by Seidelmann Yachts